Toufik Mekhalfi (born 30 January 2002 in Toulouse) is a French professional squash player. As of March 2021, he was ranked number 166 in the world.

References

2002 births
Living people
French male squash players